Kazzaz (also Romanized as Kazzāz; also known as Kazāz-e Soflá, Kazāz Pā’īn, and Kazzāz-e Pā’īn) is a village in Pol-e Doab Rural District, Zalian District, Shazand County, Markazi Province, Iran. At the 2006 census, its population was 2,148, in 536 families.

References 

Populated places in Shazand County